Calliobasis is a genus of sea snails, marine gastropod mollusks in the family Seguenziidae.

The name Calliobasis was formed from the Ancient Greek words kallion (= more beautiful) and basis (= pedestal). Its gender is feminine.

Species
Species within the genus Calliobasis include:
Calliobasis bilix (Hedley, 1905)
Calliobasis bombax (Cotton & Godfrey, 1938)
Calliobasis chlorosa Marshall, 1983
 † Calliobasis eos B. A. Marshall, 1983
Calliobasis festiva Marshall, 1991
Calliobasis gemmata Poppe, Tagaro & Stahlschmidt, 2015 
Calliobasis lapulapui Poppe, Tagaro & Dekker, 2006
Calliobasis magellani Poppe, Tagaro & Dekker, 2006
Calliobasis merista Marshall, 1991
Calliobasis miranda Marshall, 1983
Calliobasis nepticula Marshall, 1991
Calliobasis phimosa Marshall, 1991
Calliobasis spectrum Marshall, 1991

References

Marshall B.A. (1991). Mollusca Gastropoda : Seguenziidae from New Caledonia and the Loyalty Islands. In A. Crosnier & P. Bouchet (Eds) Résultats des campagnes Musorstom, vol. 7. Mémoires du Muséum National d'Histoire Naturelle, A, 150:41-109. [

 
Seguenziidae
Gastropod genera